Michael Coletti (born 17 August 1995 in Italy) is an Italian motorcycle racer.

Career statistics

Grand Prix motorcycle racing

By season

Races by year

References

External links

http://www.civ.tv/pilota/michael-coletti/

1995 births
Living people
Italian motorcycle racers
Moto3 World Championship riders